Tears on the Telephone may refer to:

 "Le Téléphone Pleure", a hit single by Claude François, rerecord in English as "Tears on the Telephone" in 1975
 "Tears on the Telephone", a 1983 hit single by Hot Chocolate